Pakkading (ປາກກະດິງ , literally 'mouth of the (river)', is a district (muang) of Bolikhamsai province in central Laos. It is home to the 1,690 km2 Nam Kading National Biodiversity Conservation Area (NBCA).

References

Districts of Bolikhamsai province